Mara Brock Akil (born Mara Dionne Brock; May 27, 1970) is an American screenwriter and television producer. She created the UPN comedy series Girlfriends (2000–2008) and its spin-off The Game (2006–2015). She later created the first drama series for BET Being Mary Jane (2013–2019). In 2018, she produced Black Lightning for The CW and created Love Is for the Oprah Winfrey Network.

Early life and education
She was born in Los Angeles, California to Joan Demeter, and was raised primarily in Kansas City. When Brock Akil was eight years old, Demeter divorced Brock Akil's father, later becoming the vision behind Brock Akil's main character in Girlfriends. Demeter left Los Angeles and moved to Kansas City, where she was able to work her way up from an entry-level position at Marion Labs to a computer programmer, while raising Brock Akil and her two siblings: brother William "Bill" Brock and younger sister, actress Kara Brock.

She graduated from Raytown South High School in 1988. She is a graduate of Northwestern University, where she earned a bachelor's degree in journalism and became a member of the Delta Sigma Theta sorority. While at Northwestern, she penned and acted in a sketch comedy show for Northwestern's Black Student Union, played the lead in a production of The Colored Museum, and took a screenwriting course taught by author and screenwriter, Delle Chatman. Brock Akil moved to Los Angeles a year after graduation and landed a job as a production assistant.

Career
Brock Akil first began writing for television in 1994 writing for the critically acclaimed but short-lived Fox series South Central. In 1999, she served as supervising producer and writer on The Jamie Foxx Show after writing for Moesha for four seasons. In 2000, Brock Akil created and executive produced (along with Kelsey Grammer) another UPN series, Girlfriends. She also created and executive produced a spin-off to Girlfriends, The Game, along with her husband Salim Akil. In 2009, Brock Akil became a consulting producer and writer for the ABC suburban sitcom Cougar Town. She is the creator of BET's Being Mary Jane, which premiered in 2013.

Brock Akil went straight to UPN and sold her idea for her hit series to the network. She shopped the series around to studios to start the filming process, but, even though the show sold to a major network, no filming company wanted to take the bait. She struck a deal with Kelsey Grammer, and his involvement with Paramount Pictures was able to sign on as an executive producer for the show. Girlfriends premiered on September 11, 2000, and became a part of UPN's Monday night prime time lineup. Chronicling the life of Joan Clayton, played by Tracee Ellis Ross, and her three friends, the show ran for eight seasons, lasting through the production switch from UPN and the launch of The CW network. The show's two-part series finale aired on the CW on February 11, 2008.

Following the launch of the CW network, Brock Akil created a spin-off series to her first show that follows the life of Joan's cousin, Melanie Barnett, played by Tia Mowry. She places her dreams of being a doctor on hold and moves to San Diego to be a supportive backbone to her boyfriend, professional football player Derwin Davis, played by Pooch Hall. The series ran on the CW network for three seasons until its abrupt ending in 2009. The show was canceled for about two years until it was picked up by BET and began production in Atlanta. The Game brought in 7.7 million viewers in its Season 4 premiere on BET. After adding six more seasons to the series, the network released a statement on its website stating that the show would conclude after production of the seventh and eighth seasons.

With an already established relationship with the BET network, Brock Akil worked alongside her husband to co-write and produce their first show on BET. Being Mary Jane, starring Gabrielle Union premiered July 2, 2013, and became the couple's first hour-long scripted show. The show chronicles the life of Mary Jane Paul, a successful news anchor, and attempts to address the statistic that within the black community 42 percent of successful women will never marry.

As of March 2017, Brock Akil left ICM Partners to join CAA. More recently in September 2020, she signed a multi-year overall deal with Netflix to create new original content, under her new production company story27 productions.

The Akils created and executive produced a scripted superhero series, Black Lightning, based on DC Comics' Black Lightning series. The show premiered on January 16, 2018.

Legal issues 
Staci Robinson, writer and author of Interceptions, filed a 40 million-dollar lawsuit against Brock Akil and the CW network, accusing Brock Akil of stealing the concept of her hit CW comedy series "The Game" from Robinson's novel that was unpublished when she showed it to her in 2001. Robinson claimed she thought of the show first because her novel chronicles the life of Stefanie Porter, a senior studying law at UCLA, who ceases her hopes of becoming a lawyer to support the dreams of her boyfriend, star football player Ricky Powers.

Personal life 
Brock Akil met Salim Akil while working on the set of Moesha, and the two married in 1999. Salim also went on to establish a career in the industry as a television director, most notably as the showrunner of Black Lightning, on The CW. The couple has two children. She and her husband, Salim, are practicing Sufi Muslims.

The Akils created  Love is ___, which was based on their relationship, but was canceled after a woman accused Salim of domestic violence in an alleged extramarital affair, as well as copyright infringement by using her screenplay as the basis for the series. A statement made by Akil's lawyers denied all allegations.

Along with friends Gina Prince-Bythewood, Sara Finney Johnson and Felicia D. Henderson, Akil endows The Four Sisters Scholarship.

Filmography

Film

Television

Awards and nominations

References

External links
 
Akil Productions Official Site
 Creator Commentaries (CW Network)

1970 births
African-American Muslims
African-American screenwriters
Screenwriters from California
Television producers from California
American women television producers
American television writers
Living people
Medill School of Journalism alumni
Writers from Los Angeles
American women television writers
Showrunners
Delta Sigma Theta members
21st-century African-American writers
21st-century African-American women writers
21st-century American women writers
20th-century African-American writers
20th-century African-American women writers
20th-century American women writers
20th-century American screenwriters
21st-century American screenwriters